Slavyanskoye Urban Settlement is the name of several municipal formations in Russia.

Slavyanskoye Urban Settlement, a municipal formation within Slavyansky Municipal District which the Town of Slavyansk-na-Kubani in Krasnodar Krai is incorporated as
Slavyanskoye Urban Settlement, a municipal formation which the urban-type settlement of Slavyanka and six rural localities in Khasansky District of Primorsky Krai are incorporated as

See also
Slavyansky (disambiguation)

References

Notes

Sources

